Narupon Wild (born July 21, 1988), simply known as Nazza, is a Thai professional footballer who plays as a midfielder.

Club career
Born on the small island of Koh Samet in Thailand but also holding a British passport, Nazza was raised all over the world.

He was primarily educated in the Dutch youth football system at AFC Amsterdam and in the English youth system at The New Saints F.C. After being offered a full scholarship to the Florida Institute of Technology, he again explored another part of the world playing for the Florida Tech Panthers. After graduating with a bachelor's degree in Business Administration, he returned to the Netherlands on trial at FC Volendam in the Jupiler League before signing a short-term contract with AGOVV Apeldoorn.

His first professional contract was with Bangkok United in the Thai 1st divisions. He helps them get a promotion to the Thai Premier League in his first year. 3 years later he joined BBCU F.C. and also helped them get promoted to the Thai Premier League while also being captain. After 2 successful season, Buriram United signed Nazza to a 3-year contract in 2016. He became a Thai Premier League Champion in 2017 and was then purchased by his current club Suphanburi FC in 2018.

Honours

Club
The New Saints
 Welsh Premier League (1): 2006–07
 FAW Premier Cup (1): 2006–07

Buriram United
 Thai League 1 (1): 2017
 Mekong Club Championship (1):  2016

References

External links

1988 births
Living people
Narupon Wild
Narupon Wild
Association football midfielders
The New Saints F.C. players
AGOVV Apeldoorn players
Narupon Wild
Narupon Wild
Narupon Wild
Narupon Wild
Narupon Wild
Narupon Wild
Narupon Wild
Narupon Wild
Narupon Wild
Thai expatriate sportspeople in Malaysia
Thai expatriate sportspeople in the Netherlands
Thai expatriate sportspeople in the United Kingdom